The Music Gallery is an independent performance venue in Toronto, Ontario, Canada. It is known as a space for musical and interdisciplinary projects in experimental genres. The Music Gallery is publicly funded through arts grants from the city, province, and country, and through membership and ticket sales.

History
The Music Gallery was founded in 1976, by members of the improvisational experimental group CCMC. The musicians ran the space and performed there regularly until 2000. CCMC artists also established the Music Gallery Editions record label and Musicworks.

The Music Gallery's motto is "Toronto's Centre for Creative Music." John Oswald, in an editorial describing the founding of Musicworks, described it as "an experimental music performance facility." Others have called it "one of the city's most magical, best-kept secrets," "a vital venue," "seedbed for cultural multiplicity and emerging hybridity," and "one of Toronto's cultural gems."

Locations
From its founding in 1976 until 1983, the Music Gallery was in a converted warehouse at 30 St. Patrick Street, including offices for Musicworks from 1978 onwards.

From 1983 to 1993, the venue was at 1087 Queen West, in the basement of what was originally West Toronto's first YMCA, a space now known as the Great Hall (which has fostered other cultural groups such as the Theatre Centre and the YYZ Gallery).

From 1991 to 2000, the Music Gallery occupied a space at 179 Richmond Street West. The Music Gallery's website describes it as "the fabled multi-purpose space" and "a strange oasis for creativity and experimentation on the outskirts of Toronto’s uber-commercialized entertainment district.” This venue hosted up to 150 concerts a year, until they were evicted in 2000. For a year, the Music Gallery was a “Guerrilla Gallery” throwing events in various alternate venues.

Since 2001, it has been in St. George the Martyr Church, located at 197 John Street. The venue has a unique agreement with the church and its parishioners (as well as those who live in the church's residences) that allows for office space, and early-evening programming within the sanctuary itself. Because the venue must obey sound law and stop all performances at 11pm, they have invested energies in daytime programming and all-ages events.

Programming 
The Music Gallery has used "streams" of programming to organize its diverse genres and foci. These streams have included Classic Avant, Jazz Avant, Pop Avant, World Avant, and New World. The Gallery ceased programming in streams in 2014.

Since 2006, the Music Gallery has run the annual X Avant Festival as a season launch in the fall. The festival is a way to invite musicians from all of the Gallery's streams and genres into one event. The 10th anniversary X Avant X (also celebrating the Gallery's 40th anniversary) featured Lori Freedman, CCMC, Tyondai Braxton, Sandro Perri, and Absolutely Free.

Previous festivals and collaborations include an electronic music festival in collaboration with A Space, shows with the Wavelength Concert Series, and interdisciplinary performances with the Images Festival.

Notable performers in past years include the Nihilist Spasm Band, Sunn O))), Owen Pallett, Hauschka, Jennifer Castle, Wyrd Visions, John Oswald, Casey Sokol, Stars of the Lid, Derek Bailey, the Microphones, Jens Lekman, A Tribe Called Red, and Devendra Banhart.

The Music Gallery started a weekly radio show called "Radio Music Gallery" in 1983, on CKLN-FM; the show played recorded performances from the venue. Gallery performances are also regularly broadcast on CBC Radio.

In 2011, the Music Gallery had a season-closing fundraiser called "Tonalism" that lasted twelve hours and featured projected visuals and musicians including Julia Holter, Dntel, Teebs, and Isla Craig.

In 2015, the Music Gallery hosted a discussion panel on racism in the Toronto and Canadian music scene, moderated by April Aliermo, after several controversial events in the industry, including a band with a racially offensive name being boycotted, and several cancelled events that were protested for being colonial and patronizing.

Music Gallery recordings 
The Music Gallery Editions record label was active from 1977 to 1981. Twenty-seven albums were issued, mostly performances at the gallery, but also collections of Iroquois and Inuit music, Quebec folk music, and recordings of whales. 

(The published index notes that after MGE19 "at this point the catalogue numbering becomes erratic.")

There was one release in the Canadian Music Heritage Collection, Inuit Throat and Harp Songs, by Inuit women of Povungnituk (catalogue number MH001).

Many other recordings exist of Music Gallery performances. The Music Gallery fonds at the Clara Thomas Archives and Special Collections at York University contains the archive of recordings before 1998, including audio reels, cassettes, and PCM recordings on VHS tapes of both live music and lectures, panels, and discussions.

Music Gallery Editions published a book, Decade: The First Ten Years of the Music Gallery, in 1985.

Jazz musician Peter Katz also released a live album, Live At The Music Gallery, in 2001.

Directors, Curators, and Staff

References

Bibliography

External links 
 
 Live recordings from The Music Gallery on Soundcloud
 The Music Gallery archives at the Clara Thomas Archives and Special Collections, York University Libraries, Toronto, Ontario

Arts organizations based in Canada
Music venues in Toronto
Music organizations based in Canada
Canadian independent record labels
Defunct record labels of Canada